Nueve de Julio Department may refer to:

 Nueve de Julio Department, Chaco
 Nueve de Julio Department, Río Negro
 Nueve de Julio Department, San Juan
 Nueve de Julio Department, Santa Fe

See also 
 Nueve de Julio District in Perú
 Nueve de Julio Partido in Argentina
 Nueve de Julio (disambiguation), towns in Argentina

Department name disambiguation pages